Jane Espenson (born July 14, 1964) is an American television writer and producer.

Espenson has worked on both situation comedies and serial dramas.  She had a five-year stint as a writer and producer on Buffy the Vampire Slayer and shared a Hugo Award with Drew Goddard for her writing on the episode "Conversations with Dead People".

After her work on Buffy, she wrote and produced episodes of The O.C. and Gilmore Girls among other series. From 2006 to 2010, she worked on Battlestar Galactica and several projects related to it. Between 2009 and 2010, she served on Caprica, as co-executive and executive producer and co-showrunner. In 2010, she wrote an episode of HBO's Game of Thrones, eventually earning a Writers' Guild Award for her involvement with the show. In 2011 she joined the writing staff for the fourth season of the British television program Torchwood, which aired on BBC One in the United Kingdom and Starz in the United States during mid-2011.

From 2011 to 2018, Espenson worked as a consulting producer and co-executive producer on ABC's series Once Upon a Time, and also wrote and directed some of the show's supplementary DVD content and helped develop the show's spin-off series. She co-wrote and produced Husbands, an independent original web series, with co-creator Brad Bell. She and Bell were nominated for a Writers' Guild Award for their work on the series. Espenson also contributed writing to seasons 1 and 3 of the Marvel series Jessica Jones.

She is an executive producer of the HBO series The Nevers along with creator Joss Whedon and fellow Buffy alum Doug Petrie.

She has written numerous comic books, edited multiple volumes of essays, and published several short stories.

Early life
Espenson grew up in Ames, Iowa, and graduated from Ames High School. As a teenager, Espenson found out that M*A*S*H accepted spec scripts without requiring the writer to have industry representation. Though she was not an established writer, she attempted to write a script. She recalls, "It was a disaster. I never sent it. I didn't know the correct format. I didn't know the address of where to send it, and then I thought, they can't really hire me until I finish junior high anyway."

Linguistics studies
Espenson studied linguistics as an undergraduate and graduate at University of California, Berkeley. She worked as a cognitive linguistics research assistant for George Lakoff, who acknowledged her work on the metaphorical understanding of event structure in English and credited her with recognizing the existence of the phenomenon of location-object duality in metaphors pairs.  Lakoff also mentioned her year-long work on the "metaphorical structure of causation" in the acknowledgments section of Philosophy in the Flesh: The Embodied Mind and Its Challenge to Western Thought (1999).

While in graduate school, she submitted several spec scripts for Star Trek: The Next Generation as part of a script submission program open to amateur writers; Espenson has referred to the program as the "last open door of show business".

Career
In 1992 Espenson won a spot in the Disney Writing Fellowship, which led to work on a number of sitcoms, including ABC's comedy Dinosaurs and Touchstone Television's short-lived Monty. This was followed by work on the short-lived sitcoms Me and the Boys, and Something So Right. In 1997 she joined the writing staff of Ellen Degeneres's sitcom Ellen.

Buffy the Vampire Slayer

After years in sitcoms, Espenson decided to switch from comedic to dramatic writing and submitted her sample scripts to Buffy the Vampire Slayer.

In 1998, Espenson joined Mutant Enemy Productions as executive story editor for the third season of Buffy the Vampire Slayer. Over the rest of the run of the series, Espenson wrote or co-wrote twenty-three episodes, starting with "Band Candy" and ending with Buffys penultimate episode, "End of Days". After her role as an executive story editor, she was promoted to co-producer in season four. In the fifth season she was promoted again to producer. She took up the role of supervising producer in the sixth season and was promoted once more to co-executive producer in the final season.

She wrote episodes both humorous (e.g. "Triangle" and "Intervention") and serious (such as "After Life"). Espenson and Drew Goddard co-wrote the seventh-season episode "Conversations with Dead People," for which they won the Hugo Award for Best Short Dramatic Presentation in 2003.

Espenson is credited as the writer or co-writer of the following Buffy episodes:

She also co-/wrote several comic book stories for Tales of the Slayers, Tales of the Vampires and Buffy the Vampire Slayer Season Eight, the one-shots Jonathan and Reunion and the limited series Haunted.

Battlestar Galactica and Caprica

Espenson joined the crew of Sci Fi's Battlestar Galactica (BSG) just after Battlestar Galactica: Razor, BSG's first television movie, was conceived.  As one of BSG's co-executive producers, she worked on every fourth-season episode starting with "He That Believeth in Me"; she was also the writer of "Escape Velocity" and "The Hub" and co-wrote The Face of the Enemy webisodes.  Prior to joining the show's staff she wrote one third-season episode and co-wrote another. In August 2008, the Los Angeles Times broke the news that Espenson was the writer behind BSG's second television movie, The Plan, news confirmed in her writer's blog. In January 2009 it was announced that she had joined the spin-off series Caprica as co-executive producer and would take on showrunner duties midway through the first season. Espenson later gave up showrunning duties to focus more on writing.

Torchwood
In August 2010 it was announced that Torchwood creator, lead writer and executive producer Russell T. Davies had hired Espenson to write for the show's fourth series, Torchwood: Miracle Day to be broadcast in 2011. She later confirmed that she would be writing episodes 3, 5, 7 and co-writing episode 8 (with Ryan Scott) and episode 10 (with Davies). Prior to her involvement with Torchwood, Espenson had said she was a fan of the show, particularly the third series, "Children of Earth." To tie in with the launch of Torchwood: Miracle Day, Espenson and Scott collaborated on the Starz-produced 2011 Torchwood webseries entitled Torchwood: Web of Lies, which stars American actress Eliza Dushku. Following the broadcast of each episode of "Miracle Day" on Starz, Espenson wrote a blog on AfterElton mixing her reaction to the episode with behind the scenes information on the devising process.

Husbands
In 2011 Espenson also co-wrote and produced her first independent web series with partner Brad Bell. Entitled Husbands, it revolved around the life of two newly married gay men. Espenson self-funded the first season. A Kickstarter campaign and the involvement of CW Seed allowed subsequent production. The show eventually comprised four "seasons" and concluded in 2014. The series premiered Tuesday September 13, 2011. The series also generated Husbands, a hardback comic-book collection of stories rendered in a variety of different drawing styles, from Dark Horse Comics. .

Once Upon a Time
In May 2011, Espenson was brought on to the ABC fantasy series Once Upon a Time, as a writer and consulting producer. She stayed with the show for its entire seven-year run, and became a co-executive producer on the project. She was also involved in creation and writing of the spin-off series Once Upon a Time in Wonderland.

Game of Thrones
In 2011, working as a freelancer, Espenson wrote episode 6 of season 1 of Game of Thrones, titled "A Golden Crown". It is notable as one of only four Game of Thrones episodes written by women.

Jessica Jones
In 2015, during the hiatus between seasons of Once Upon a Time, Espenson consulted on the series Jessica Jones, earning a "thanks to" in the credits. In 2019, she returned for a larger role on the staff, and wrote the eleventh episode of the third season "A.K.A. Hellcat".

The Nevers
In 2018, Espenson joined the HBO series The Nevers, as a writer and executive producer. The series premiered on April 11, 2021.

Other
Espenson has written episodes for several other television shows, including episode 4.17 ("Accession") of Star Trek: Deep Space Nine, and one episode ("Shindig") of Firefly.  She has worked on Angel, Tru Calling, The Inside, The Batman, Andy Barker, P.I., Jake in Progress and Dollhouse, and was the co-creator of Warehouse 13.

Espenson is the editor of the book Finding Serenity: Anti-Heroes, Lost Shepherds and Space Hookers in Joss Whedon's Firefly (BenBella Books, 2005), a collection of non-fiction essays on the short-lived television show Firefly. She edited the follow-up collection Serenity Found: More Unauthorized Essays on Joss Whedon's Firefly Universe (BenBella Books, 2007) She is the editor of Inside Joss' Dollhouse: From Alpha to Rossum (BenBella Books, 2010), a similar collection of essays about Dollhouse.

Espenson wrote the short story "What Holds Us Down", which appears in Still Flying from Titan Press, . Her short story "Int. Wolf-Night" appears in Empower: Fight Like a Girl  She also has short stories which appear in the Tales of the Slayers book series. Her short story, "Nobel Prize Speech Draft of Paul Winterhoeven, With Personal Notes", was published in the September 2021 issue of Future Science Fiction Digest.

In 2016, Espenson served on the MoPOP (Museum of Pop Culture, Seattle) committee to select inductees into the Science Fiction and Fantasy Hall of Fame. She is featured as a video/voice commentator in the museum itself.

Espenson has written for three of the 101 Best Television Series as determined by the Writers Guild of America: Battlestar Galactica, Game of Thrones and Buffy the Vampire Slayer.

Appearances in media
Espenson has appeared as an "expert witness" on the Judge John Hodgman podcast episodes "Science Friction" and "Vampirical Evidence." In 2012, Espenson was a guest on the interview series Cocktails with Stan, with hosts Stan Lee and Jenna Busch. She has also been a guest on The Sound of Young America, with Jesse Thorn. She has guested on the Gilmore Guys podcast and on the Slayerfest podcast, about Gilmore Girls and Buffy respectively.

She appears in the documentary interview series James Cameron's Story of Science Fiction and Showrunners.

Production credits

Accolades

References

External links 

 
 Jane Espenson Interview on AMC

1964 births
Living people
American comics writers
American television producers
American women television producers
American television writers
Hugo Award-winning writers
People from Ames, Iowa
University of California, Berkeley alumni
American women television writers
Ames High School alumni
Female comics writers
Hugo Award-winning writers
Women science fiction and fantasy writers
Inkpot Award winners